Philippe Félix Balthasar Otto Ghislain, Count de Merode (13 April 1791 – 7 February 1857), known as Félix de Merode, was a Belgian politician.

Biography
Born in Maastricht, Merode's father was mayor of Brussels during the period in which modern Belgium formed part of France. Under the First French Empire, Merode lived in Paris. In 1809 he married Rosalie de Gramont, niece by marriage of the Marquis de Lafayette.

Merode settled in the southern part of the United Kingdom of the Netherlands—modern Belgium—and was one of the leaders of the Belgian Revolution of 1830. He served in the Provisional Government of Belgium and in the Belgian National Congress which was elected in November 1830. Merode was proposed as a candidate for the throne of the newly created Belgium, but refused to be considered as he was not a prince, merely a count. Merode's brother Frédéric was killed during the fighting against the forces of King William I following the revolution.

He formed part of the delegation to Paris which sought to have Louis, Duke of Nemours, second son of King Louis Philippe I, accept the throne, but this approach was rebuffed by the French king. Merode was a confidant of the eventual king, Leopold I, and was made a Minister of State in 1831.

He served as Foreign affairs, War, and Finance minister in the 1830s. He resigned from office in 1839 as he was unwilling to sign the Treaty of London ceding Belgian territory to the Kingdom of the Netherlands.

Charles Forbes René de Montalembert was his son in law, and Montalembert's political ideas were supported by Merode. His son Frédéric-François-Xavier Ghislain de Mérode served as a minister to Pope Pius IX.

Honours 
 : Iron Cross.
 : Minister of State, By Royal Decree.
 : Grand Cordon in the Order of Leopold.
 Knight Grand Cross in the Order of Saint Gregory the Great.
 : Knight Grand Cross in the Order of Christ.
 : Officier in the Legion of Honour.

See also
 List of defence ministers of Belgium

References

External links

 Biographie générale des belges morts ou vivants, P Roger, 1849, at Google Books.

1791 births
1857 deaths
Members of the National Congress of Belgium
Belgian Ministers of State
Burials at the Cathedral of St. Michael and St. Gudula
Fe
Belgian Ministers of Defence